Beach sepak takraw at the 2008 Asian Beach Games were held from 18 October to 25 October 2008 in Bali, Indonesia.

Medalists

Medal table

Results

Men's regu

Preliminaries

Group A

Group B

Knockout round

Men's team regu

Preliminaries

Group A

Group B

Knockout round

Women's regu

Preliminaries

Group X

Group Y

Knockout round

Women's team regu

Preliminaries

Group X

Group Y

Knockout round

References
 Official website

2008 Asian Beach Games events
2008